Gerald Michael McKenzie (13 January 1904 – 23 September 1977) was an Australian rules footballer who played with Fitzroy in the Victorian Football League (VFL).

Family
The son of John Charles Ross McKenzie (1869-1948), and Bridget Teresa McKenzie (1872-1968), née O'Dwyer, Gerald Michael McKenzie was born at Rushworth, Victoria on 13 January 1904.

He married Agnes Frayne Gerber (1914-1997) in 1939.

Football
Recruited from South Bendigo Football Club in the Bendigo Football League, with whom he had played for five seasons (1925-1929).

He returned to South Bendigo, as captain-coach, in 1931.

Notes

References

External links 

1904 births
1977 deaths
Australian rules footballers from Victoria (Australia)
South Bendigo Football Club players
Fitzroy Football Club players